Arceto Martinez Clark (born September 29, 1989) is an American football wide receiver who is currently a free agent. He played college football for the Mississippi State. He signed with the Seattle Seahawks as an undrafted free agent in 2013. With the Seahawks, he won Super Bowl XLVIII over the Denver Broncos.

Early years
Clark was born in Tupelo, Mississippi. A graduate of Shannon High School in Shannon, Mississippi, Clark was selected to play in the Mississippi-Alabama High School All-Star game at the wide receiver position. He was ranked among the top 25 high school recruits in the state of Mississippi by The Clarion-Ledger following the conclusion of his senior season. He was selected as the Class 4A Division 4 Offensive Most Valuable Player  in high school.

Professional career

Seattle Seahawks
On June 4, 2013, he signed with the Seattle Seahawks as an undrafted free agent. On August 31, 2013, he was released by the Seahawks.

Cleveland Browns
On September 10, 2013, he signed with the Cleveland Browns.

Seattle Seahawks (second stint)
On October 2, 2013, he re-signed with the Seattle Seahawks to join the practice squad. He was released by the Seahawks on August 30, 2014.

References

External links
Mississippi State bio
Seattle Seahawks bio

Living people
1989 births
American football wide receivers
Mississippi State Bulldogs football players
Seattle Seahawks players
Sportspeople from Tupelo, Mississippi
Players of American football from Mississippi
Cleveland Browns players